Mike Pellegrino is a former professional lacrosse player and American football coach who is the cornerbacks coach for the New England Patriots of the National Football League (NFL).

Coaching career

New England Patriots
Pellegrino joined the Patriots as an intern in 2015. He would serve as a coaching assistant for four seasons in total before being promoted to Cornerbacks Coach in 2019.

Pellegrino was part of the Patriots coaching staff that won Super Bowl LI. In the game, the Patriots defeated the Atlanta Falcons by a score of 34–28 in overtime. He won his second Super Bowl title when the Patriots defeated the Los Angeles Rams in Super Bowl LIII.

Personal life
Pellegrino was a star on the Johns Hopkins lacrosse team where he was selected as captain for two years. He was also selected as an All-American twice. In the 2015 Major League Lacrosse Draft, Pellegrino was drafted by the New York Lizards in the second-round where he would play for a year. Thereafter, he joined the Boston Cannons for his second season. He is the son of Joseph and Kerri-ann Pellegrino, and he has one brother Joe.

References

External links 
 Johns Hopkins Athletics bio
 New England Patriots bio

1993 births
Living people
New England Patriots coaches
People from Oakdale, New York
Players of American football from New York (state)
Boston Cannons players
New York Lizards players